Timothy Patrick McGuire (born July 19, 1965) is a retired United States Army major general who last served as the Deputy Commanding General of the United States Army Installation Management Command from August 2018 to June 2021. Previously, he served as the Deputy Commanding General of United States Army Europe.

McGuire is a 1987 graduate of the United States Military Academy with a B.S. degree in diplomatic and strategic history. He later earned a master's degree in international relations from the University of Chile and a second master's degree in national security and strategic studies from the Naval War College.

References

External links
 

1965 births
Living people
Place of birth missing (living people)
United States Military Academy alumni
University of Chile alumni
Naval War College alumni
United States Army generals